Carbondale (formerly, Buckeye) is a former settlement in Amador County, California.

The place's early economy was related to coal mining and shipment.  A post office operated at Carbondale from 1922 to 1955.

Nothing remains of Carbondale today.

References

External links

Unincorporated communities in California
Unincorporated communities in Amador County, California